Volkan Yaman (born 27 August 1982) is a Turkish former footballer. Yaman is known with his powerful shots.

Career
Yaman has made his debut for Antalyaspor against Çaykur Rizespor on August 6, 2006. He has also been called for the Turkish national team, debuting on May 24, 2006 in Turkey's 3–3 draw against Belgium in Fenix Stadion, Genk.

Honours
Galatasaray
Süper Lig (1): 2007–08
Süper Kupa (1): 2008

References

External links
 

1982 births
Living people
Turkish footballers
Turkey international footballers
German footballers
German people of Turkish descent
Süper Lig players
Antalyaspor footballers
Galatasaray S.K. footballers
Eskişehirspor footballers
Kasımpaşa S.K. footballers
Association football defenders
Association football midfielders
Footballers from Munich
VfR Garching players
SV Heimstetten players